Lake Street Dive is an album by American band Lake Street Dive, released in 2010.

Reception

Writing for Allmusic, music critic j. poet wrote of the album "Lake Street Dive don't sound anything like a band you'd hear in a dive. They're a bright, bubbly pop-jazz quartet and write songs that would fit perfectly on an AAA, lite jazz, or adult contemporary station. "

Track listing

Personnel
Rachael Price – lead vocals
Mike “McDuck” Olson – guitar, trumpet
Bridget Kearney – acoustic bass, background vocals
Mike Calabrese – drums, background vocals

Special Guests
Alex Asher - trombone
Jesse Dee – vocals
Lyle Brewer – guitar 
Eric Lane - keyboards
Margaret Glaspy, Kimber Ludiker, Luke Price - violins
Alex Spiegelman - saxophone
Liam Robinson - accordion
Emeen Zarookian - piano on "We All Love the Same Songs"

Technical personnel
Jack Younger assisted by Evan Ruscher,  Recording Engineer
Nick Zampiello & Rob Gonella,  Mastering at New Alliance East Cambridge MA

Design
Margaret Kearney,  Art & Design

References

2010 albums
Lake Street Dive albums